Bulamagi–Igayaza–Kakumiro Road is a road in the Western Region of Uganda, connecting the town of Bulamagi, in Kakumiro District to the town of Kakumiro, the capital and largest urban center in the district.

Location
The geographical coordinates of this road in the neighborhood of Igayaza, Kakumiro District are: 0°57'19.0"N, 31°09'05.0"E (Latitude:0.955278; Longitude:31.151389).

Upgrading to bitumen
The government of Uganda has earmarked this road for upgrading through the conversion of the existing gravel road to bitumen surface and the building of bridges, drainage channels, culverts and intersections.

In January 2018, the Uganda National Roads Authority (UNRA), on behalf of the government of Uganda, awarded the renovation contract to China Wuyi Industrial Company (CWIC). The renovation is funded in part, by a $40 million loan provided by the Exim Bank of China. Other credible sources have quoted the combined renovation price for this road and the connecting Buhimba–Nalweyo–Kakindu–Bulamagi Road at US$138 million.

As of April 2018, the contractor was in the pre-construction mobilization phase.

Controversy
In August 2018, the Uganda's Public Procurement and Disposal of Public Assets Authority (PPDA), halted the procurement of an engineering consultant for this road and for the connecting Buhimba–Nalweyo–Kakindu–Bulamagi Road, citing irregularities in the process. The procurement has to be re-advertised from the start.

See also
 Hoima District
 Uganda Oil Refinery
 Economy of Uganda
 Uganda–Tanzania Crude Oil Pipeline

References

External links
 Uganda National Road Authority Homepage
  Oil Sparks Roads Upgrade

Roads in Uganda
Kakumiro District
Western Region, Uganda
Petroleum infrastructure in Uganda